Raga Aberi is an album by the Indian musician L. Shankar, released in 1995. He is credited with Zakir Hussain and Vikku Vinayakram.

The album was nominated for a Grammy Award, in the "Best World Music Album" category.

Production
Produced by Shankar and the Epidemics, the album was recorded at Syntasy Studios. Shankar's wife, Caroline, played the tamboura drone. Shankar employed the ragam tanam pallavi form on Raga Aberi. He played a 10-string double violin.

Critical reception

The Edmonton Journal wrote that "if [Shankar]'s one to wear his heart on his sleeve (especially in the opening solo rangam) it's not without careful attention to an almost mystical level of technique, or the considerable intellectual complexity he spins in interacting with the percussionists during the later parts of the raga." The Republican determined that "Shankar not only plays with breathtaking speed, he's also mastered the art of dynamics, letting the instrument breathe and taking advantage of the violin's full tonal qualities." Billboard called the album "masterful."

AllMusic wrote that "the energy is consistently high, and there are a lot of solos by each musician, as well as deftly coordinated unison passages." In 1999, Dirty Linen called "Raga Aberi" the highlight of the  India – Jewels of the Subcontinent compilation, writing that it "features some dazzling percussion interplay and a double konnakol break."

Track listing

References

Lakshminarayana Shankar albums
1995 albums